Chandini Sreedharan is an Indian actress who appears mainly in Malayalam films, along with a few Tamil, Telugu and Kannada films. She made her acting debut with the 2013 Tamil film Ainthu Ainthu Ainthu.  She's notable for her Malayalam films such as KL 10 Patthu (2015), Darvinte Parinamam (2016) and Comrade in America (2017).

Career 
In 2013, Chandini Sreedharan debuted with the Tamil movie Ainthu Ainthu Ainthu, directed by Sasi. She played the female lead opposite Bharath. She was known as Mrithika in the film credits. Her second movie was in Telugu, Chakkiligintha, directed by Vema Reddy. She played the female lead opposite Sumanth Ashwin. She was credited as Rehhana in this film.

Her third movie was in Malayalam, KL 10 Patthu, directed by Muhsin Parari. She played the female lead opposite Unni Mukundan. This time she used her real name, and plans to do the same in all industries in the future. Then she acted in the Malayalam movie Darvinte Parinamam directed by Jijo Antony. She played the female lead opposite Prithviraj.

Filmography

References 

Living people
1995 births
Indian actresses